The Europe/Africa Zone is one of the three zones of the regional Davis Cup competition in 1988.

In the Europe/Africa Zone there are two different tiers, called groups, in which teams compete against each other to advance to the upper tier.

Group I

Winners in Group I were promoted to the following year's World Group. Teams who lost in the first round competed in the relegation play-offs, with winning teams remaining in Group I, whereas teams who lost their play-offs were relegated to the Europe/Africa Zone Group IIs in 1989.

Participating nations

Draw

Group II Europe

The winner in the Europe Zone Group II advanced to the Europe/Africa Zone Group I in 1989.

Participating nations

Draw

  are promoted to Group I in 1989.

Group II Africa

The winner in the Africa Zone Group II advanced to the Europe/Africa Zone Group I in 1989.

Participating nations

Draw

  are promoted to Group I in 1989.

External links
Davis Cup official website

Davis Cup Europe/Africa Zone
Europe Africa Zone